For Years Now is a book of 23 poems by the German writer W. G. Sebald with images provided by British visual artist Tess Jaray. It was published by Short Books, London in 2001.

References
For years now Sebald W.G., Jaray, Tess. Short Books, London 2001

External links
 Article on For years now in Sebald Word Press

2001 poetry books
German poetry collections
Works by W. G. Sebald